A list of films released in France in 1934:

See also
 1934 in France

Notes

External links
 French films of 1934 at the Internet Movie Database
French films of 1934 at Cinema-francais.fr

1934
Films
Lists of 1934 films by country or language